Behexhed Hydi was an Albanian politician and mayor of Elbasan from 1925 through 1928.

References

Year of birth missing
Year of death missing
Mayors of Elbasan